Yorkshire Cancer Research is a registered charity that helps the people of Yorkshire avoid, survive and cope with cancer.

Founded in 1925, Yorkshire Cancer Research is the largest independent regional cancer charity in England. Funded entirely by its donors, the charity has supported vital projects across the county for 90 years, mainly in the county's prestigious regional universities and teaching hospitals, including Bradford University, Hull University, Leeds University, Sheffield University and York University and their associated teaching hospitals.

Yorkshire Cancer Research is the only charity committed to reducing the devastating impact of cancer on the lives of people living in and around Yorkshire, where cancer outcomes are below the national average and incidence rates are higher than the national average.

The charity is dedicated to preventing, diagnosing and treating cancer more effectively by forming powerful partnerships with researchers, scientists and clinicians, other charities, the NHS and Public Health and care organisations.

Yorkshire Cancer Research is a member of the Association of Medical Research Charities (AMRC).

See also 
 Cancer in the United Kingdom

References

External links
 Yorkshire Cancer Research
 BBC article on research at the Yorkshire Cancer Research Unit

Cancer organisations based in the United Kingdom
Health charities in the United Kingdom
Cancer research
Organisations based in Harrogate
Charities based in North Yorkshire
Health in Yorkshire